Jennifer Lopez has appeared in many motion pictures and television programs. She is one of the highest-paid actresses in Hollywood and is the highest-paid actress of Latin descent, making up to US$20 million per film role. She is also the richest actress in Hollywood, with an estimated net worth of $400 million (as of 2020). Lopez made her acting debut at age 16 with a small role in the 1986 film My Little Girl. From there, she received her first high-profile job in 1992 as a Fly Girl dancer on the television comedy program In Living Color. Following her departure from the show in 1993, Lopez made two guest appearances in the television series South Central, appeared in the made-for-television movie Lost in the Wild (1993) and starred as Melinda Lopez in the television series Second Chances (1993) and its spin-off Hotel Malibu (1994). Second Chances and Hotel Malibu ran for only a brief period, receiving negative reviews. Lopez's first major film role came in the 1995 motion picture Money Train, alongside Wesley Snipes and Woody Harrelson. The film faced negative reviews and is considered to be a box office bomb. Her next two film roles in Jack (1996) and Blood and Wine (1997) were received similarly; however, critics were divided by the latter. Lopez received her first leading role in the Selena biopic of the same name in 1997. The film was a commercial and critical success and is often cited by critics as her breakout role. Later that year, Lopez starred as Terri Chavez in the film Anaconda, which garnered negative reviews from critics despite being a box office success. In 1998, Lopez starred alongside George Clooney in the crime film Out of Sight (1998). The film met with positive reviews and was a box office success. In the same year, she also lent her voice to the animated film Antz.

Following the launch of her music career in 1999, Lopez returned to films as the star of the 2000 psychological thriller The Cell. In 2001, Lopez starred in the films The Wedding Planner and Angel Eyes, which were received unfavorably. The simultaneous release of The Wedding Planner and her second album J.Lo made Lopez the first person in history to have a number one album and film in the same week. Lopez starred alongside Ralph Fiennes in the romantic comedy Maid in Manhattan in 2002. The film received mixed reviews, despite its box office success. In 2003 and 2004 she starred alongside then-boyfriend Ben Affleck in the films Gigli and Jersey Girl. Critics wrote negatively of both films, and Gigli is considered one of the worst films of all time. Lopez retained box office success co-starring in the 2004 film Shall We Dance? alongside Richard Gere. She then co-starred opposite Jane Fonda in the romantic horror film Monster-in-Law (2005). Following the role, Lopez starred in the independent films An Unfinished Life (2005), El Cantante (2006) and Bordertown (2007); she also acted as the executive producer of El Cantante. In 2006 and 2007 Lopez worked further behind the scenes as an executive producer of the television series South Beach and DanceLife, the film Feel the Noise and the mini-series Jennifer Lopez Presents: Como Ama una Mujer.

Following the birth of her twins in 2008, Lopez took a break from her career. She made her return to the small screen and the big screen in 2010, making a guest appearance in an episode of How I Met Your Mother and starring in the film The Back-up Plan. In 2011 and 2012, during their tenth and eleventh seasons, Lopez was a judge on the reality television singing competition American Idol. She earned a reported $12 million for her first and $20 million for her second season on the show. In 2012, she launched ¡Q'Viva! The Chosen, a talent show created by Simon Fuller, that followed Lopez, Marc Anthony and director-choreographer Jamie King as they travelled across 21 Latin American countries to find talent for a Las Vegas show. Lopez co-starred alongside an ensemble cast consisting of Cameron Diaz, Elizabeth Banks, Matthew Morrison and Dennis Quaid in the film What to Expect When You're Expecting (2012). The film, which is based on the book of the same name, was a moderate commercial success and received generally negative reviews from film critics. Later that same year, she lent her voice to the animated film, Ice Age: Continental Drift, the fourth in the Ice Age franchise. The film gave Lopez her highest opening weekend figure.

Film

Television

Video games

References

External links 
 

Actress filmographies
Works by Jennifer Lopez
American filmographies